Sir Codrington Edmund Carrington, FRS, FSA (22 October 1769 – 28 November 1849) was an English barrister, Chief Justice of Ceylon, and a Member of Parliament.

Life
He was the son of Codrington Carrington, of the Blackmoor estate on Barbados, and the eldest daughter of the Rev. Edmund Morris, rector of Nutshalling, the friend of Lady Hervey; and was born at Longwood, Hampshire, on 22 October 1769. He was educated at Winchester College and called to the bar at the Middle Temple on 10 February 1792. In the same year he went to India, where, being admitted an advocate of the supreme court of judicature, he for some time acted at Calcutta as junior counsel to the East India Company, and made the acquaintance of Sir William Jones.

Carrington returned to England for health reasons in 1799. In 1800, still in England, he was called on to prepare a code of laws for Ceylon, and was then appointed the first chief justice of the supreme court of judicature that had been created. He was knighted before he embarked on his outward voyage.

In 1806 Carrington was compelled by bad health to resign his post, and declined other colonial appointments. Having purchased an estate in Buckinghamshire, he became a magistrate and deputy-lieutenant of that county, where he acted for many years as chairman of the quarter sessions. He was created DCL and elected Fellow of the Royal Society, Fellow of the Society of Antiquaries of London, and honorary member of the Société Française Statistique Universelle.

In June 1826 Carrington was elected Tory M.P. for St. Mawes, which he continued to represent till 1831. During his last years he resided mainly at St Helier in Jersey. He died at Exmouth on 28 November 1849.

Works
After the Manchester riots of 1819 Carrington published Inquiry into the Law relative to Public Assemblies of the People. He was also the author of a Letter to the Marquis of Buckingham on the Condition of Prisons (1819), and other pamphlets.

References

Attribution

1769 births
1849 deaths
Chief Justices of British Ceylon
British expatriates in Sri Lanka
19th-century Sri Lankan people
Sri Lankan people of British descent
People from British Ceylon
English barristers
19th-century English judges
Members of the Parliament of the United Kingdom for St Mawes
Fellows of the Royal Society
Fellows of the Society of Antiquaries of London
UK MPs 1826–1830
UK MPs 1830–1831
British India judges